Shahneh Kola may refer to:
 Shahneh Kola, Amol
 Shahneh Kola, Juybar